Saw Than Htut (born 2 March  1958) is a Burmese politician who currently serves as an Amyotha Hluttaw MP for Kayin State No. 2 Constituency. He is a member of the National League for Democracy.

Early life and education
Saw was born on 2 March 1958 in Yangon, Myanmar. He is an ethnic Karen. He graduated with B.ECom (Eco) from Yangon Institute of Economics.

Political career
He is a member of the National League for Democracy. In the 2015 Myanmar general election, he was elected as an Amyotha Hluttaw MP, winning a majority of 38184 votes and elected representative from Kayin  State No. 2, parliamentary constituency. And then, he serves as the chairman of Amyotha Hluttaw Public Accounts Committee.

References

National League for Democracy politicians
1958 births
Living people
People from Yangon
Burmese people of Karen descent